Honorine Flore Lydie Magba is a Central African Republic diplomat. She is deputy chief of mission to the United States. She was Ambassador to Ivory Coast.

References

External links 

 Lydie Flore Magba Ambassadeur Je-suis-un-exemple-palpable-de-la-place-que-le-president-touadera-accorde-a-la-femme-centrafricaine Afriquematin.net. 2020
 

Ambassadors of the Central African Republic to Ivory Coast
Living people
Year of birth missing (living people)
Women ambassadors